Marc J. Randazza (born November 26, 1969) is an American First Amendment attorney and a commentator on Infowars and CNN on legal matters.

Early life and education
Randazza was born in Gloucester, Massachusetts. He graduated from Gloucester High School in 1987. Randazza attended the University of Massachusetts Amherst, where he majored in journalism. In 1996, Randazza was inspired to attend law school by the film The People vs. Larry Flynt. He attended Georgetown University Law Center and graduated in 2000. During law school, he interned for Denise Johnson of the Vermont Supreme Court. He continued his First Amendment education by attending the University of Florida, where he earned a master's degree in communications, writing his thesis on vote pairing, which was cited by the Ninth Circuit Court of Appeals.

Career
Randazza is licensed to practice law in Massachusetts (2002), Florida (2003), California (2010), Arizona (2010), and Nevada (2012). Randazza's first case was representing a fraternity at Boston University when the brothers of that fraternity were accused of destroying their house and other misconduct. He then began practicing in Florida as a real estate attorney. He quickly returned to the First Amendment and media field, taking on representation of an adult bookstore in Fort Myers, Florida. Soon thereafter, he moved to Orlando, Florida where his practice in First Amendment and media law expanded. He started representing defendants in SLAPP suits, pornography businesses, protestors, in often unpopular constitutional law matters.

In 2004, his University of Florida thesis gained attention as vote pairing became a minor issue during the 2004 election. Randazza was asked to debate the issue on Fox News, and thereafter has been a frequent legal commentator on television and in print. Randazza served as a professor of law at Barry University School of Law, located in Orlando, Florida. where he taught First Amendment law, copyright law, trademark law, and entertainment law.

Randazza has a practice that primarily focuses on the areas of First Amendment litigation, adult entertainment, trademark and copyright litigation, and domain name arbitration disputes. He has represented a number of well-known adult entertainment companies including Kink.com, Bang Bus, and Milf Hunter. He also represents media businesses such as BME and bloggers in SLAPP suits.

Representing Neo-Nazis and alt-right figures 
Randazza represents multiple far-right figures, including conspiracy theorists Alex Jones, Mike Cernovich, and Chuck Johnson; and neo-Nazi, white supremacist, antisemitic conspiracy theorist Andrew Anglin. Randazza defended a participant in the planning of the violent Unite the Right rally who used the pseudonym "Kristall.night" (cf. Kristallnacht). Kristall.night claimed that a federal subpoena against the app Discord following the deadly rally would reveal her identity and expose her to potential harm through doxing.

Randazza has defended Anglin in a lawsuit filed by a Jewish realtor in Whitefish, Montana, whom Anglin had published the name and address of on his neo-Nazi website The Daily Stormer. Randazza had argued that Anglin was not responsible for the subsequent harassment and death threats the woman received, as the personal information was protected as free speech. This claim was rejected by U.S. District Court Judge Dana L. Christensen, who noted that Anglin was actively encouraging and participating in the plaintiff's harassment, and that calls to violence against a private individual are not protected speech.

Representing InfoWars 
Randazza was set to represent Alex Jones, the founder of InfoWars, in a Connecticut Superior Court case in 2018 after the infamous conspiracy theorist was sued by six families of children killed in the 2012 Sandy Hook school shooting. However, when Randazza filed a pro hac vice application to be added to the Sandy Hook case as an out-of-state lawyer, the judge denied it, citing "serious misconduct," namely the discipline arising from the dispute with Liberty Media Holdings noted below. Randazza's firm, however, continued to represent Jones on and off in the litigation, even though Randazza himself did not enter an appearance.

Randazza also represented Infowars in a copyright dispute over the use of a Pepe the Frog image.

He also filed suit for Infowars against the Federal Aviation Administration to permit the use of a drone to gather news footage at the U.S./Mexico border.

Adult entertainment law
Randazza has gained attention for handling high-profile First Amendment cases and for his defense of the adult entertainment field.

Anti-SLAPP
He has represented the defendant in Beck v. Eiland-Hall, a case before the World Intellectual Property Organization (WIPO) filed by political commentator Glenn Beck, concerning a satire website parodying Beck. The WIPO arbitrator ruled against Beck in the case, and in favor of Randazza's client.

In late 2011, Randazza and his firm effectively killed Righthaven, a "copyright troll" company briefly infamous for buying limited rights to copyrighted works for the sole purpose of bringing lawsuits against alleged infringers. On May 9, 2013, the United States Court of Appeals for the Ninth Circuit affirmed the lower court's decision dismissing the case for lack of standing. Righthaven complained of what it called Randazza's "scorched earth judgment enforcement efforts" in its legal filings.

In 2013, Randazza lobbied the Nevada legislature to update Nevada's Anti-SLAPP statute.

On June 8, 2015, Governor Sandoval signed Nevada Senate bill 444, which in its initial form, stood to largely repeal the Nevada Anti-SLAPP law. The initial form of the law was backed by casino mogul, Steve Wynn. Randazza lobbied to keep the statute in its speech-protective form.

Klingon language
On April 27, 2016, Randazza filed a friend of the court brief in the lawsuit by Paramount Pictures and CBS against Axanar Productions on behalf of the Language Creation Society. The lawsuit concerned a 21-minute fan-made short film, Prelude to Axanar. Paramount Pictures and CBS claimed, among other things, that the film infringed their rights by making use of the Klingon language. Randazza argued that Klingon is a living language, and, as such, is a "state of mind"—a system or process, which cannot be copyrighted, unlike a work. Randazza contended that since Klingon was invented in the 1980s, the language has expanded past its origins, pointing to examples like dictionaries, translations of Shakespeare, the Klingon Language Institute, official government statements, a wedding conducted in Klingon, and translation service available through Bing. To support its point, portions of the brief were written in Klingon, employing the Klingon alphabet.

Response to the brief was generally positive. Attorney and blogger Kevin Underhill called it "a terrific brief", and Attorney Ken White of Popehat wrote that "Marc continues to demonstrate that legal writing can be entertaining, irreverent, and persuasive at the same time." In an article on the blog Mental Floss, Linguist Arika Okrent particularly praised the incorporation of the Klingon language into arguments. Ethan Chiel of Fusion called the brief "a joy to read" and remarked that it was "wonderful to see what is essentially (very serious) fun being had in demonstrating a point in a legal proceeding."

About three weeks after the brief was filed, in an interview on May 20, 2016, J. J. Abrams said that Paramount would drop the lawsuit "within the next few weeks." Abrams further stated that he pushed the studio to stop the lawsuit because "we realized this is not the appropriate way to deal with the fans."

The Satanic Temple
In May 2018 The Satanic Temple (TST) sued Twitter for religious discrimination with pro bono support from Randazza. In August, the Los Angeles chapter of TST disaffiliated in protest, calling Randazza a "Twitter troll and an agent of the alt-right."

The Gateway Pundit 
In November 2022, Randazza filed suit on behalf of Jordan Conradson, a reporter for The Gateway Pundit (along with the publisher TGP Communications, LLC), because Conradson was denied a press pass; although a preliminary injunction was denied by the lower court, the Ninth Circuit Court of Appeals granted the injunction because the denial violated the First Amendment—it was not "viewpoint neutral." To the contrary, the Ninth Circuit found "that a predominant reason for the County denying Conradson a press pass was the viewpoint expressed in his writings."

Other
Randazza has handled a number of "cameras in the courtroom" cases, defending the rights of the news media to attend and televise courtroom proceedings. Most notably, Randazza successfully argued this issue against Alan Dershowitz. In that case, Randazza represented Courtroom View Network in its quest to televise a highly publicized trial in Las Vegas involving the Las Vegas Sands.

On Oct. 1, 2014, Randazza was named by Desert Companion Magazine to its top lawyers in Southern Nevada list.

In 2021, Randazza began representing former Boston Ballet dancer Dusty Button and her husband, Mitchell Taylor Button. Court documents include claims of federal sex trafficking and forced labor violations against both Dusty and Taylor Button, as well as separate accusations about Taylor Button for assault, battery, false imprisonment, and sexual exploitation of a minor.

Dispute with Liberty Media Holdings

On June 3, 2015, there was an interim arbitration award against Randazza involving Liberty Media Holdings LLC, for whom Randazza had been General Counsel from 2009 to 2012. The Ars Technica article on that case referenced a statement from Randazza's arbitration attorney to the Law Society of Upper Canada calling the arbitrator's neutrality into question. The arbitration dispute arose following Randazza's departure from Liberty and his filing of employment claims against them. Liberty's counterclaims against Randazza in the arbitration focused on allegations Randazza had negotiated bribes from opposing parties in copyright litigation, engaged in conflicts of interest, destroyed evidence, unjustly enriched himself, and committed other breaches of fiduciary duty. Following two and a half years of arbitration proceedings, the arbitrator issued an interim award in favor of Liberty and against Randazza on all claims. Following his arbitration loss, Randazza filed for Chapter 11 bankruptcy protection.  The arbitration was ultimately vacated in its entirety, by agreement, after a court refused to confirm the arbitration award.

Arising from the same dispute, the  State Bar of Nevada charged Randazza with alleged violations of Nevada Rules of Professional Conduct and Randazza entered into a Conditional Guilty Plea as to two allegations: 1.8 (Conflict of Interest: Current Clients: Specific Rules) & 5.6 (Restrictions on Right to Practice); all other claims were dismissed. As a Florida court later found, refuting the arbitrator, nothing Randazza did "was actually adverse to" Liberty Media Holdings.  Randazza was given a one-year suspension, stayed for 18 months, with the requirement that he avoid subsequent ethics complaints for the 18 months following entry of the order, complete 20 hours of CLE classes, and pay the costs associated with the proceedings within 30 days.   The Nevada suspension was not put into effect.

In reciprocal proceedings, on January 14, 2019, the Arizona State Bar issued a public reprimand and a suspension based upon some of the misconduct that took place in Nevada. A new disciplinary case was opened in Arizona and California based upon further information and documentation of alleged misconduct by Randazza, to include allegedly lying in court documents related to the Alex Jones case in Connecticut.  However, beyond the reciprocal disciplinary proceedings, Randazza was not charged with any new violations and the Arizona suspension was not put into effect.

On May 2, 2019, in the Supreme Judicial Court for Suffolk County, Massachusetts, in a state bar disciplinary proceeding styled In re: Mark John Randazza, Case No. BD-2018-110, a hearing was conducted, which included an additional alleged ethical violation that the bar counsel claimed the State Bar of Nevada ignored. The Massachusetts Supreme Judicial Court did not find this additional ethical violation existed and issued a stayed suspension of the same term as Nevada.  The Florida Supreme Court conducted a similar reciprocal disciplinary proceeding; it found no aggravating factors, with the Referee finding that there was "no clear and convincing evidence to suggest that anything [Randazza] may have done on behalf of his other clients was actually adverse to" his complaining clients.  Thus, Randazza was given a reprimand and one year probation in Florida.

Bibliography 

 "The Constitutionality of Online Vote Swapping" - 34 Loyola of Los Angeles Law Review 1297 (2001)
 "Breaking Duverger's Law is not Illegal: Strategic Voting, the Internet and the 2000 Presidential Election" - 2001 UCLA Journal of Law and Technology 6
 "The Other Election Controversy of Y2K: Core First Amendment Values and High-Tech Political Coalitions"   - 82 Washington University Law Quarterly 143 (2004)
 "The Florida Supreme Court Dulls the Edge of Rule 1.420(e)" - 80 Florida Bar Journal 39 (2006)
 "Gambling in America's Senior Communities" (Daniel Russell, co-author) - 8 Marquette Elder Law Advisor 343 (2007)
 "The Need for a Unified and Cohesive National Anti-SLAPP Law" - 91 Oregon Law Review 627 (2013)
 "Nevada's New Anti-SLAPP Law: The Silver State Sets the Gold Standard" - 21 Nevada Lawyer Magazine 7 (2013)
 "The Legal Status of Making Adult Films in Nevada" - 23 Nevada Lawyer Magazine 20 (2015)
 "Freedom of Expression and Morality Based Impediments to the Enforcement of Intellectual Property Rights" - 16 Nevada Law Journal 107 (2016)
 "Lenz v. Universal: A Call to Reform Section 512(f) of the DMCA and to Strengthen Fair Use" - 18 Vanderbilt Journal of Entertainment & Technology Law (2016)
 "Ulysses: A Mighty Hero in the Fight for Freedom of Expression" - 11 University of Massachusetts Law Review 268 (2016)

References

External links 

 Firm biography
 Marc Randazza's contributions to Popehat

1969 births
Living people
American bloggers
American educators
American lawyers
Free speech activists
People from Gloucester, Massachusetts
University of Massachusetts Amherst College of Social and Behavioral Sciences alumni
Georgetown University Law Center alumni
University of Florida alumni